Lactarius adscitus is a member of the large milk-cap genus Lactarius in the order Russulales. The species was first described in 1885 by German mycologist Max Britzelmayr.

See also 
 List of Lactarius species

References

External links 
 

adscitus
Fungi described in 1885
Taxa named by Max Britzelmayr